Ayitham is a 1988 Indian Malayalam-language drama film written and directed by Venu Nagavally and produced by Ambika and Radha sisters. The film stars Mohanlal, Ambika, Radha and Sukumari in lead roles. The film features music composed by M. G. Radhakrishnan. The plot is set in an Agraharam.

Plot
Vasudevan is a renowned singer of a village. Once his small village was known in his name. However, with fame came comfort; comfort to pursue his innate wild nature. This led to destruction of his life and his family. His son, Shankaran is unemployed and Bhama, daughter of the village's landlord is in love with him. Though he doesn't reciprocate as she would love to. The villagers are poor but they try to live as decently as possible with available resources. However, it becomes impossible for everyone to handle the poverty and low quality of life. This leads them to alternative choices that are not that decent, and those some conform to it to just survive. Bhama is married off to Mani Iyer, another reputable singer but her marriage is not a happy one. Because Mani Iyer is also not a stranger to the wilder comforts that fame provides. The questions of will Shankaran be able to find a job that can uplift his family, and will Bhama find happiness again in her life, form the climax of the story. The film is a diorama of life in poverty and people trying to live through it with values and fellowship.

Cast
 
Mohanlal as Shankaran
Ambika as Bhama
Radha as Chinna
Nedumudi Venu as Rangan
Priya (actress) as Kasthoori
Sukumari
Jagathy Sreekumar as N. S. Thovala
Innocent as Joseph
L. P. R. Varma as Vasudhevan Bhagavathar
Murali as Kachery Mani Iyyer
Santhosh as Govindhankutty
Maniyanpilla Raju as Thankamai
Sukumaran as Abu
Seema as Paapamma
V. K. Ramasamy as Periyaswamy
Sankaradi as Vikraman
Louba Schild as Louba

Production
Ayitham was produced by actresses and sisters Ambika and Radha through their production house ARS Productions, they also appeared in the principal roles alongside Mohanlal. The film was written by Venu Nagavally and was also his third directorial. Actor-politician M. G. Ramachandran had come as a guest in the pooja function of the film.

Soundtrack
The film features original songs composed by M. G. Radhakrishnan and lyrics by O. N. V. Kurup. The song "Oruvakkil Oru Nokkil" was based on the jog raga.

Release
Ayitham was released in theatres on 7 April 1988.

References

External links
 
 Ayitham on Eros Now
 Ayitham on Amazon Prime Video

1988 films
1980s Malayalam-language films